Elspeth Mary Davie (née Dryer) (20 March 1918 - 14 November 1995) was a Scottish novelist, short story writer, painter, and art teacher.  Her novels include Providings (1965) and Creating a Scene (1971), but she achieved most of her acclaim for her short stories, principally for the collections The Spark (1968) and The Man Who Wanted To Smell Books (2001).

Davie was awarded the 1978 Katherine Mansfield Prize for Short Stories. Her work was released by the world-famous Calder Publications. She was married to the Scottish philosopher and writer George Elder Davie.

References

1918 births
1995 deaths
Scottish novelists
20th-century Scottish painters
20th-century British novelists